"Southside" is a song by American rapper Lil Baby. It was released by 4 Pockets Full, Wolfpack Music Group, Quality Control Music, Motown and Capitol Records on May 8, 2018 as the first single from Lil Baby's debut album Harder Than Ever (2018). It was produced by Southside and Max Lord.

Composition
The song features "street-oriented bars" from Lil Baby, who pays homage to his Atlanta neighborhood and raps about "everything from swag, Crips, and his Draco".

Music video
The music video was released on May 8, 2018, and directed by Edgar Esteves. Filmed in Lil Baby's neighborhood, Baby "gathers everyone for this video". They are shown dancing and flashing money on a "sunny spring day".

Charts

Certifications

References

2018 singles
2018 songs
Capitol Records singles
Lil Baby songs
Motown singles
Song recordings produced by Southside (record producer)
Songs written by Lil Baby
Songs written by Southside (record producer)